Constance Darnowski (born December 10, 1934) is an American hurdler. She competed in the 80 metres hurdles at the 1952 Summer Olympics and the 1956 Summer Olympics.

References

External links
 

1934 births
Living people
Athletes (track and field) at the 1952 Summer Olympics
Athletes (track and field) at the 1956 Summer Olympics
American female hurdlers
Olympic track and field athletes of the United States
Athletes (track and field) at the 1955 Pan American Games
Pan American Games track and field athletes for the United States
Sportspeople from Brooklyn
Track and field athletes from New York City
21st-century American women
20th-century American women